Rune Ivar Charles Andersson (11 May 1930 – 9 October 2006) was a Swedish rower who won a silver medal in the eights at the 1955 European Championships. He competed in this event at the 1952, 1956 and 1960 Olympics and finished fourth in 1956.

References

1930 births
2006 deaths
Swedish male rowers
Olympic rowers of Sweden
Rowers at the 1952 Summer Olympics
Rowers at the 1956 Summer Olympics
Rowers at the 1960 Summer Olympics
European Rowing Championships medalists
20th-century Swedish people